Joaquin Castro (born September 16, 1974) is an American lawyer and Democratic politician who has represented Texas's 20th congressional district in the United States House of Representatives since 2013. The district includes just over half of his native San Antonio, as well as some of its nearby suburbs. From 2003 to 2013, Castro represented the 125th district in the Texas House of Representatives. While in the state legislature, he served as vice-chair of the Higher Education Committee and was a member of the Judiciary & Civil Jurisprudence Committee. He also previously served on other committees, such as County Affairs, Border & International Affairs, and Juvenile Justice & Family Issues.

Joaquin served as campaign chair for his identical twin brother, Julian Castro, during his 2020 presidential campaign.

Early life, education, and early career
Castro was born and raised in San Antonio and attended Thomas Jefferson High School. He has said that his interest in public service developed at a young age from watching his parents' involvement in political campaigns and civic causes. His father, Jessie Guzman, is a retired mathematics teacher from the Edgewood Independent School District on San Antonio's west side, and his mother, Marie "Rosie" Castro, is a community activist. Jessie and Rosie never married. Castro's mother named him after Rodolfo Gonzales's poem I Am Joaquin. He graduated with honors from Stanford University with a Bachelor of Arts in political science and communications and earned a Juris Doctor with his twin brother at Harvard Law School. After law school, the brothers both worked for the law firm Akin Gump Strauss Hauer & Feld before starting their own firm in 2005.

Castro has worked in public education, health care, and the juvenile justice system. He is a member of the National College Advising Corps, St. Mary's University Mission and Identity Taskforce, St. Philip's College President's Advisory Board, and Texas Family Impact Seminar.

Texas House of Representatives

Elections
Castro ran for Texas's 125th House district seat in 2002. In the Democratic primary, he defeated incumbent Representative Arthur Reyna, 64% to 36%. In the general election, he defeated Republican nominee Nelson Balido, 60% to 40%. He was 28 at the time of his election. In 2004, he was reelected unopposed. In 2006, he was reelected to a third term, defeating Balido, 58% to 38%. In 2008, he was reelected to a fourth term unopposed. In 2010, he was reelected to a fifth term, defeating Libertarian Jeffrey Blunt, 78% to 22%.

Committee assignments
County Affairs
Higher Education (Vice Chair)
Judiciary & Civil Jurisprudence
Oversight of Higher Ed Governance, Excellence & Transparency

U.S. House of Representatives

Elections
In June 2011, Castro announced his candidacy for the newly drawn 's seat in the U.S. House of Representatives.  He was initially set to challenge fellow Democrat and nine-term incumbent Lloyd Doggett, whose home in Austin had been drawn into the district, in the Democratic primary, but on November 28, after Charlie Gonzalez of the neighboring 20th district announced his retirement after seven terms, Castro announced that he would run instead for the 20th district seat. He was unopposed in the Democratic primary, all but assuring him of winning the general election in this heavily Democratic, Hispanic-majority district. At the 2012 Democratic National Convention, he introduced his brother Julián as keynote speaker. In November, Castro defeated Republican nominee David Rosa 64%-34%. becoming only the fifth person to represent this district since its creation in 1935.

In 2017, San Antonio Express-News columnist Bruce Davidson questioned Castro's decision not to enter the 2018 U.S. Senate race against Republican incumbent Ted Cruz, a 2016 presidential candidate. Davidson predicted that Castro could have defeated the announced candidate, Beto O'Rourke, representative of Texas's 16th congressional district based in El Paso, for the Democratic nomination. "Castro is said to be ambitious, but will he ever have a better chance to move up than in the Trump-era against Ted Cruz?," Davidson wrote. He added that Texas's other senator, Republican John Cornyn, would have taken advantage of a similar opportunity to run. In 2002, Cornyn, the state's then one-term attorney general, filed to succeed retiring Republican Senator Phil Gramm, while two other Republican hopefuls, Henry Bonilla of Texas's 23rd congressional district and David Dewhurst, the land commissioner and later the lieutenant governor, vacillated and lost their chances to become a senator. Bonilla was defeated for House reelection after redistricting in 2006, and Dewhurst lost the 2012 Republican runoff Senate election to Cruz.

Tenure

Castro was sworn into office on January 3, 2013, becoming a member of the 113th United States Congress. He was chosen as the president of the freshman class of Democrats in the 113th Congress.

In the 114th Congress, House Democratic Whip Steny Hoyer named Castro a Chief Deputy Whip. During the 2016 presidential election, Castro served as a surrogate for Hillary Clinton's campaign. He was selected as chair of the Congressional Hispanic Caucus for the 116th Congress.

Castro voted against a House resolution condemning the UN Security Council Resolution 2334, which called Israeli settlement building in the occupied Palestinian territories a "flagrant violation" of international law and a major obstacle to peace.

On January 12, 2019, Castro introduced and endorsed his twin brother, former HUD Secretary Julián Castro, at the launch rally of Julián's 2020 presidential campaign.

In February 2019, Castro authored House Joint Resolution 46 to overturn Trump's declaration of a National Emergency Concerning the Southern Border of the United States, under which Trump said he would divert funds from other sources to construct a wall along the U.S. and Mexico border. The bill passed the House by a vote of 245–182 on February 15, and the Senate by a vote of 59–41 on March 15. Trump vetoed the Joint Resolution on March 15.

In August 2019, Castro tweeted the names and employers of 44 San Antonio residents who had given the maximum allowable contribution to Trump's reelection campaign. He said it was "sad to see so many San Antonians" whose "contributions are fueling a campaign of hate that labels Hispanic immigrants as 'invaders'." The information came from publicly available lists published by the Federal Election Commission. Republicans denounced the tweet, saying that such a "target list" invites harassment and could even encourage violence.

In July 2020, following the primary defeat of House Foreign Affairs Committee chairperson Eliot Engel, Castro declared his candidacy for chair. Gregory Meeks also announced his candidacy and Brad Sherman, who defeated former chairperson Howard Berman in a 2012 primary, is expected to run as well.

On January 12, 2021, Castro was named an impeachment manager for Trump's second impeachment.

Committee assignments
Permanent Select Committee on Intelligence
Subcommittee on Counterterrorism, Counterintelligence and Counterproliferation
Subcommittee on Intelligence Modernization and Readiness
Committee on Foreign Affairs
Subcommittee on International Development, International Organizations and Global Corporate Social Impact (Chair)
Subcommittee on Western Hemisphere, Civilian Security, Migration and International Economic Policy

Caucus memberships
New Democrat Coalition
Congressional Hispanic Caucus
U.S.-Japan Caucus
Congressional Armenian Caucus

Personal life

Family
Castro is the son of Jesse Guzman and Rosie Castro and the identical twin brother of Julián Castro, the former mayor of San Antonio and the 16th United States Secretary of Housing and Urban Development; he is one minute younger than Julián. In 2019, Joaquin grew a beard so that people could distinguish him from his brother.

In 2013, Castro became engaged to Anna Flores. Julián Castro made the announcement on his Facebook page. The couple had a daughter in 2013, a son in 2016, and a second daughter in 2022.

Other work and board memberships
While in the Texas Legislature, Castro practiced law in San Antonio. He has also been a visiting professor of law at St. Mary's University and an adjunct professor at Trinity University in San Antonio. He sits on several boards of nonprofit organizations and institutions of higher education, including Achieving the Dream, the National College Advising Corps, St. Phillip's College President's Advisory Board, St. Mary's University Mission and Identity Taskforce, and the National Association of Latino Elected and Appointed Officials' (NALEO) Taskforce on Education.

Health
In February 2023, Castro had surgery to remove neuroendocrine tumors and described his prognosis as "good" afterward.

See also
 List of Hispanic and Latino Americans in the United States Congress

References

External links

Congressman Joaquin Castro official U.S. House website
Joaquin Castro for Congress

|-

|-

|-

1974 births
21st-century American politicians
American politicians of Mexican descent
Jefferson High School (San Antonio, Texas) alumni
Harvard Law School alumni
Hispanic and Latino American state legislators in Texas
Hispanic and Latino American members of the United States Congress
Democratic Party members of the United States House of Representatives from Texas
Identical twin politicians
Living people
Democratic Party members of the Texas House of Representatives
Politicians from San Antonio
Stanford University alumni
Texas lawyers
American twins
Julian Castro